Luciana Nascimento  (born ) is a retired Brazilian female volleyball player, who played as a wing spiker.

She was part of the Brazil women's national volleyball team at the 2002 FIVB Volleyball Women's World Championship in Germany. On club level she played with EC Pinheiros.

Clubs
 EC Pinheiros (2002)

References

External links
Getty Images

1980 births
Living people
Brazilian women's volleyball players
Place of birth missing (living people)
Wing spikers